a lakebed, the bottom of a lake
Camp Lakebottom
Topher Payne works "Lakebottom Proper" in 2011 and "Lakebottom Prime" in 2013
Weracoba - St. Elmo in MidTown (Columbus, Georgia) one of the neighborhoods in Columbus, Georgia